Matthew Francis Beach (born 22 December 1977 in Guildford, Surrey, Great Britain) is a New Zealand taekwondo practitioner of British origin. Beach qualified for the men's heavyweight division (+80 kg) at the 2008 Summer Olympics in Beijing, after winning the Oceanian Qualification Tournament in Nouméa, New Caledonia. He lost the preliminary round of sixteen match to China's Liu Xiaobo, with a score of 1–4. Beach currently resides in Bogota, Colombia, where he is employed by the British Embassy as an immigration officer.

References

External links

Profile – NZ Olympic Team
NBC 2008 Olympics profile

New Zealand male taekwondo practitioners
1977 births
Living people
Olympic taekwondo practitioners of New Zealand
Taekwondo practitioners at the 2008 Summer Olympics
English emigrants to New Zealand
Sportspeople from Guildford